Realce is a studio album released by Brazilian singer Gilberto Gil in 1979. It is the last album of Gil's "Re" trilogy, the others being Refazenda (1975) and Refavela (1977).

Track listing 
Tracks 1-9 appear on the original 1979 release. Tracks 10-16 are included with the 2003 CD reissue. All tracks by Gilberto Gil except when it noted.
Realce
Sarará Miolo
Superhomem, a canção
Tradição
Marina (Dorival Caymmi)
Rebento
Toda Menina Baiana
Logunedé
Não Chore Mais (No Woman, No Cry) (Gilberto Gil, Vincent Ford) 
Macapá
Acertei no Milhar
Senhor Delegado
Escurinho
Minha Nega na Janela
A Situação do Escurinho
Samba Rubro-Negro (O Mais Querido)

References 

1979 albums
Gilberto Gil albums